Go Joo-won (born Go Young-chul on October 16, 1981) is a South Korean actor. He made his acting debut in the 2003 boxing series Punch, followed by a supporting role in the revenge-themed Resurrection (2005). In 2006, Go became a household name after appearing in the popular family dramas Bizarre Bunch and Famous Chil Princesses. He then played historical figures in two period dramas—King Seongjong of Joseon in The King and I (2007), and Ijinashi, the first king of Daegaya in Kim Su-ro, The Iron King (2010). Go also starred in the medical drama OB/GYN (also known as Obstetrics and Gynecology Doctors, 2010), and another family drama You're the Best, Lee Soon-shin (2013).

Filmography

Television series

Film

Variety show

Awards and nominations

References

External links
  

 
Go Joo-won  at Daum 

1981 births
Living people
South Korean male film actors
South Korean male television actors
Sogang University alumni
Yonsei University alumni
People from Gwangju
21st-century South Korean male actors